Albert Cole may refer to:

 Albert Cole (footballer) (born 1981), Sierra Leonean international footballer
 Albert Cole (Massachusetts politician) (1904–1966), Massachusetts politician
 Albert M. Cole (1901–1994), U.S. Representative from Kansas